"The Lady Takes the Cowboy Everytime" is a song written by Larry Gatlin, and recorded by American country music group Larry Gatlin & the Gatlin Brothers.  It was released in June 1984 as the third single from their album Houston to Denver.   The song reached number 3 on the Billboard Hot Country Singles chart in October 1984.

Charts

Weekly charts

Year-end charts

References

Songs about cowboys and cowgirls
1984 singles
Larry Gatlin songs
RPM Country Tracks number-one singles of the year
Columbia Records singles
Songs written by Larry Gatlin
1984 songs